Star Wars: Hunters is an upcoming free-to-play player-vs-player competitive arena combat game being developed by Zynga for Nintendo Switch, iOS and Android, set to be released in 2023. The game is set after the fall of the Galactic Empire featuring a new set of characters including bounty hunters, rebellion heroes and imperial stormtroopers.

Gameplay
Star War: Hunters is a squad-based arena shooter. Players fight in settings inspired by Star Wars locations and set between the events of Episode VI and VII. The game is set to feature a diverse set of characters including a Wookiee warrior, female Dark Side force user, a bounty hunter, and an Imperial Stormtrooper.

Development
On August 18, 2018, Zynga and Disney brokered a deal for a Star Wars game on mobile to be developed by Zynga and its subsidiary NaturalMotion. Start Wars: Hunters was formally announced during the Nintendo Direct presentation on February 17, 2021 with a teaser trailer with initial plans to release the game by the end of 2021. The first gameplay footage was shown off in September 2021 after during an Apple Event while showcasing the iPad Mini. A cinematic trailer was released shortly after depicting some of the characters featured in the game, including the Sith warrior, Rieve and Mandalorian, Aran Tal. 

In late 2021, Start Wars: Hunters was soft-launched on Android devices in India, the Philippines, Malaysia and Indonesia. Despite this, on July 18, 2022, Zynga announced that the official release of Star Wars: Hunters would be delayed until 2023.

References

Upcoming video games scheduled for 2023
Action video games
Android (operating system) games
IOS games
Multiplayer video games
Nintendo Switch games
Star Wars video games
Video games developed in the United States
Video games developed in the United Kingdom
Zynga
NaturalMotion games